Danilia angulosa is a species of sea snail, a marine gastropod mollusk in the family Chilodontidae.

Description
The size of the shell varies between 7 mm and 9 mm.

Distribution
This marine species occurs off the Philippines, New Caledonia, the Loyalty Islands, Fiji and Tonga

References

External links
 

angulosa
Gastropods described in 2005